The 253rd Infantry Division was an infantry division of the German Heer during World War II.

History

1939 
The 253rd Infantry Division was formed as part of the fourth Aufstellungswelle on 26 August 1939, the day of German mobilization. The initial divisional commander was Fritz Kühne.

Assembled in Münster in Wehrkreis VI, the 253rd Infantry Division's initial infantry regiments were numbered 453, 464, and 473, and drew upon the following reserve formations:

 Infantry Regiment 453 drew its first and third battalions from Infantry Regiment 39 Wesel, and its second battalion from Infantry Regiment 77 Cologne,
 Infantry Regiment 464 drew first, second, and third battalions, in that order, from Infantry Regiment 77 Cologne, Infantry Regiment 78 Eschweiler, and Infantry Regiment 64 Soest.
 Infantry Regiment 473 drew its first two battalions from Infantry Regiment 60 Arnsberg and its third battalion from Infantry Regiment 78 Aachen.

Additionally, the 253rd Infantry Division was equipped with Artillery Regiment 253.

1940 
On 28 January 1940, the division passed several formations to the newly assembled 298th Infantry Division of the eighth Aufstellungswelle.

In spring and summer of 1940, the 253rd Infantry Division participated in the Battle for Belgium and France. After the German victory in the west, the 253rd Infantry Division remained in northern France until early 1941.

On 30 September 1940, the division transferred about a third of its strength to the newly assembled 126th Infantry Division of the eleventh Aufstellungswelle.

1941 
On 7 March 1941, Otto Schellert took command of the division.

In May 1941, the 253rd Infantry Division was called to East Prussia in preparation for Operation Barbarossa.

During the German attack on the Soviet Union, the 253rd Infantry Division attacked through Lithuania and fought at the Battle for Velikiye Luki and the Battles of Rzhev. It also fought defensive actions against the Soviet Winter campaign of 1941–42.

1942 
In January 1942, the 253rd Infantry Division was encircled at Lake Volgo, but managed to break out and return to German lines with heavy casualties.

Throughout the year 1942, the 253rd Infantry Division remained in the Rzhev salient.

1943 
On 18 January 1943, Carl Becker replaced Schellert as divisional commander.

On 17 April 1943, the former Infantry Regiment 473, now renamed Grenadier Regiment 473, was dissolved. Two of the battalions were integrated into the Regiment 426 and 453. The rest of Regiment 473 became Divisional Battalion 473, resulting in a 253rd Infantry Division with two ternary regiments and one additional battalion, for a total of seven battalions.

The 253rd Infantry Division took part in defeating the Soviet autumn offensives in late 1943.

1944 
On 17 June 1944, Hans Junck became divisional commander for a short period, before Carl Becker returned to his post on 28 June.

On 1 October 1944, Grenadier Regiment 473 was reassembled, using the third battalions of Regiments 453 and 464, resulting in a ternary division with three binary battalions as well as an additional battalion, for a continued total of seven battalions.

After combat under the 1st Panzer Army in the Beskids area, the 253rd Infantry Division, reduced to Kampfgruppe strength, was forced to retreat to Upper Silesia.

On 8 December 1944, Emmanuel von Kiliani temporarily took command of the division, before Carl Becker returned for a third and final tenure on 30 December.

1945 
The 253rd Infantry Division was forced from Upper Silesia to Moravia in April 1945.

The division was captured in the pocket at Deutsch-Brod in May 1945. The final commander of the division was Joachim Schwatlo-Gesterding, who had assumed command within days of surrender, on 5 May 1945.

Superior formations

Noteworthy individuals 

 Fritz Kühne, commanding general of the 253rd Infantry Division (26 August 1939 – 7 March 1941).
 Otto Schellert, commanding general of the 253rd Infantry Division (7 March 1941 – 18 January 1943).
 Carl Becker, commanding general of the 253rd Infantry Division (18 January 1943 – 17 June 1944, 28 June 1944 – 8 December 1944, 30 December 1944 – 5 May 1945)
 Hans Junck, commanding general of the 253rd Infantry Division (17 June 1944 – 28 June 1944).
 Emmanuel von Kiliani, commanding colonel of the 253rd Infantry Division (8 December 1944 – 30 December 1944).
 Joachim von Schwatlo-Gesterding, commanding general of the 253rd Infantry Division (5 May 1945 – 8 May 1945).

References 

Infantry divisions of Germany during World War II
Military units and formations established in 1939
Military units and formations disestablished in 1945